A Hukamnama (Punjabi: ਹੁਕਮਨਾਮਾ, translit. Hukamanāmā), in modern-times, refers to a hymn from the Guru Granth Sahib which is given as an injunction, order, or edict to Sikhs. It also refers to edicts issued by the contemporary Takhts. In the historical sense, it was used to refer to an issued injunction, order, or edict given by one of the Gurus of Sikhism or their officiated followers and associates during their lives.

Nowadays, after the period of human gurus, The Hukumnama refers to a hymn from a randomly selected left hand side page from the Guru Granth Sahib on a daily basis in the morning. This is seen as the order of God for that particular day. The Hukamnama is distributed and then read aloud in Gurdwaras throughout the world.

Etymology 
Hukamnama, is a compound of two words hukam, meaning command or order, and namah, meaning statement.

Collections and research 

The tradition of issuing hukamnamas began in the period of the early seventeenth century, during the time of Guru Hargobind. The Sikh gurus issued many edicts throughout their life, some of whom have been preserved and are documented in various writings by scholars. A collection of hukamnamas, whose gathering is attributed to Randhir Singh, have been studied. Serious academic research into the hukamnamas only began in the early 20th century. After the passing of Guru Gobind Singh, hukamnamas were also issued by his widow, Mata Sahib Kaur and by his disciple, Banda Singh Bahadur.

The Sikh Reference Library located at Amritsar held many authentic hukamnamas. These were lost after the events of Operation Blue Star in 1984. This collection was studied and published in two separate books by Ganda Singh and Shamsher Singh Ashok in the late 1960's.

Example
Taken from Advanced Studies in Sikhism page 33  by Jasbir Singh and Harbans Singh, the following is an example Hukamnama by Guru Gobind Singh:

Gallery

See also 

 Gurmata, a term used to refer to binding resolutions issued by the Sarbat Khalsa
 Rakhi system, the protection tax implemented by the Sikh Confederacy

References

Bibliography
 

Sikh scripture